Henry Devenish Skinner  (18 December 1886 – 9 February 1978), known as Harry Skinner or H.D. Skinner, was a notable New Zealand soldier, ethnologist, university lecturer, museum curator and director, and librarian. The son of William Skinner, he was born in New Plymouth in 1886.

Skinner received information on Māori house types and construction methods from Mere Harper.

In the 1956 New Year Honours, Skinner was appointed a Commander of the Order of the British Empire, for services as director of Otago Museum and lecturer in anthropology at the University of Otago.

The H.D. Skinner Annex of the Otago Museum, formerly the Dunedin North Post Office, was opened in August 2013, and named in honour of Skinner.

Skinner was one of 24,000 Anzac soldiers wounded at Gallipoli. In 2015, the Otago Museum opened the exhibition "Surviving Chunuk Bair: H. D. Skinner at Gallipoli'' using objects loaned by the Skinner family, including a sewing kit, medals, letters and photographs.

References

1886 births
1978 deaths
New Zealand military personnel
New Zealand curators
People from New Plymouth
Academic staff of the University of Otago
New Zealand ethnologists
New Zealand librarians
People educated at Nelson College
New Zealand recipients of the Distinguished Conduct Medal
New Zealand Commanders of the Order of the British Empire
20th-century New Zealand scientists
New Zealand military personnel of World War I

People associated with Otago Museum
New Zealand ethnographers